Hieracium diaphanoides is a species of flowering plant belonging to the family Asteraceae.

Its native range is Europe to Western Siberia.

References

diaphanoides